SUFS may refer to:
 Cysteine desulfurase, an enzyme
 Save Ulster from Sodomy